Cheng Mengyin (born 20 May 1995) is a Chinese rower.

She won a medal at the 2019 World Rowing Championships.

References

External links

1995 births
Living people
Chinese female rowers
World Rowing Championships medalists for China
21st-century Chinese women